James D. Saules was sailor who was shipwrecked off the Oregon Coast in 1841 while working in the United States Exploring Expedition. He settled in the area, after the shipwreck, making him one of the first Black settlers in the Oregon Territory. He was involved in the Cockstock incident.

Life 
There is no definite birthplace of Saules. Some historians have cited his birthplace as Peru, which is the place he was first documented, but others think it is more likely he is from the United States. This is because he would most likely have needed to produce proof of US citizenship to join the US Navy, and Silas B. Smith, a child when he met Saules, cited his origin as America, and more specifically Virginia. In addition, it is assumed Saules was a sailor before joining the United States Exploring Expedition because there is evidence he lived in New Haven in 1833. It is also uncertain if he was born enslaved or free.

In 1841 he was shipwrecked off the Oregon Coast while working in the United States Exploring Expedition. He settled in what is now Washington state, near Cape Disappointment and married; his wife was Chinook. A couple years later he moved to Oregon's Willamette Valley near what is now Oregon City, where he was involved in the Cockstock Incident. This incident is believed to be a major factor in the 1844 passage of Oregon's Black Exclusion Law. After the incident Saules was arrested and tried for allegedly causing local Native Americans to be violent against a white man. He was forced to move back to Cape Disappointment. Saul continued to experience difficulties in Washington, including the death of his wife, until his eventual death, believed to be in the early 1850s.

Cockstock incident 
The Cockstock incident was named after a Wasco Indian named Cockstock. This incident involved Cockstock, George Winslow, Dr. White, La Breton, Anderson, and James Saules himself. Of these men, La Breton was a member of the Provisional Government of Oregon.

The problem started when Saules bought a horse from Winslow that was initially promised to Cockstock after working for him. After learning his horse was gone, Cockstock confiscated the horse and continued to make threats towards the men. This prompted the sub-Indian agent, Elijah White to get involved and remove Cockstock from the Willamette Valley. Ultimately Henderson and Saules killed Cockstock out of defense for Anderson. Dr. White paid off Cockstock's family to ease tensions.

In March of 1844, a skirmish erupted in Oregon City leaving Cockstock and others mortally wounded. This conflict brought to light the possibility of an inter-racial Indian-black alliance against white settlers. This led members of the Oregon Provisional Government to pass the regions first Black Exclusion Law's in June of 1844. Though the laws received various revision, the Cockstock Incident most notably evoked the Oregon Lash Law.  In 1847, the Waillatpu riot was initiated by free black men Winslow Henderson and James D. Saules. Under this new set of laws, no black male or female could reside in Oregon for more than 3 years. Blacks were subject to public beatings and threatened with arrest for those who did not cooperate. These criminals were sold as indentured servants to any common citizen in need of labor force.

Maritime work 
Saules began his maritime career early in life. According to US Navy Lieutenant Neil M. Howison, Saules started sailing when he was about 15 years old, about 20 years before arriving on the Oregon Coast. In 1833, Saules joined a whaling crew on the Winslow in New Haven, in which he served as a mate, just below captain. There is a strong chance that Saules deserted during his deployment, possibly on Cocos Island. Nine deserters from the Winslow were picked up by another whaling ship, the Almira, and were taken to Paita, Peru. In July 1839, he joined the United States Exploring Expedition, also known as the US Ex. Ex. or the Wilkes Expedition after the commander US Navy Lieutenant Charles Wilkes. Saules' opportunity was rare for black men in Antebellum America. He joined the expedition's second year of 1839, when they stopped in Callao, Peru. He became a cook, a job with relative independence and separation from the crew. There is also a possibility Saules was a musician on the US Ex. Ex. as a fiddler or violinist. On this ship, he visited, Tuamotu Archipelago (Tuamotus), Tahiti, Samoa, Sydney, Fiji, Hawaii, and Utiroa of Drummond's Island.

Place-names controversy 
In 2016 Washington Senator Pramila Jayapal proposed an effort to change 36 place names in the state that contained racial slurs. Three of these names were "Jim Crow" place names, thought by historians to be a reference to, James (Jim) Saules, who lived in the direct vicinity of the place names. However, some locals said the names were not racist, but instead the "Jim Crow" names were derived from an Indian Chief, logger, or for birds near the location.  Although Pramila Jayapal had proposed renaming the locations "Jim Saules" in the end the locals chose three different names.

References 

History of Oregon
American sailors
19th-century American people
Year of birth missing
1850s deaths
African-American history of Oregon
African-American history of Washington (state)